Kingsize is a fictional character appearing in American comic books published by Marvel Comics.

Fictional character biography
Kingsize attacked the Wasp as she was modeling her own fashion-wear in a mall. She defeated him by firing a sting-blast at the jewel on his forehead.

Ferocia, Blue Streak, Flame, and Kingsize later broke Ricadonna from Sing Sing. Kingsize and his allies waited in the Corporation HQ on Hart Island and he trained his shapeshifting abilities, and Ricadonna told them that they would finish their job now. During the Heroes for Hire's attack on the Corporation's facility Kingsize fought Orka, and was later carried by Orka into an escape tunnel before it exploded.

Powers and abilities
Kingsize is permanently and approximately 10-12 feet in height. By touching the jewel on his brow, he can transform into any giant-sized animal form. He does not need to touch it to transform back into human form, and he transforms back to human shape when knocked unconscious; a hit of sufficient force to the jewel can knock him unconscious. He is bulletproof.

Skrull organs transplanted into his body by the Corporation allowed him to shapeshift.

References

External links
 

Comics characters introduced in 1991